Regavirumab is a human monoclonal antibody against infections with cytomegalovirus.

References 

Monoclonal antibodies
Experimental drugs